Timothy "Tim" Speedle, known by his nickname Speed, is a fictional character on the CBS crime drama CSI: Miami. He was portrayed by Rory Cochrane until the character's death in the third season opening episode "Lost Son".

Characterization 
Prior to the character's untimely demise and Rory Cochrane's departure from CSI: Miami at the start of season 3, "Speed" is distinguished in his occasional carelessness in procedure. Especially featured is his neglect of proper sidearm maintenance ("Dispo Day"), which is a contributing factor to Speed's own death.

He also, at one point, borrows Calleigh Duquesne's crime light and forgets to recharge it, much to her annoyance. Speed's cavalier attitude is also featured in other ways as well. He states that he sees his job as a CSI as no more than a "paycheck", lacking the enthusiasm for criminology and justice shared by the rest of the team ("Wannabe"). He rides his bike to work, and claims that he's happy with that rather than a standard automobile ("Lost Son").

Showcased in the series is his role as best friend to Adam Rodriguez's Eric Delko. This facet of him is evident in episode 604, "Bang, Bang, Your Debt," a full three years after Speedle's death ("Lost Son"). Delko, still feeling the effects of a head injury he received in season 5 episode 15 "Man Down"), suffers from vivid hallucinations of his deceased friend, which ultimately leads to the discovery that Audio-Visual Lab Technician Dan Cooper had stolen Speedle's credit card.

This episode, especially with Speedle's appearance therein, illustrates the ongoing trauma of the violent death of a friend (in this case, Speed) on those who were close with that individual. When Cooper claims that, since Speed is dead, no-one got hurt, Calleigh Duquesne angrily points out that Eric is hurt, and so is she, in particular, by the false hope the card charges (coupled with Delko's hallucinations) gave and Cooper is given the ultimatum of turning himself in or Calleigh will press charges herself. It is later revealed that she did not press charges in "Ambush".

Character biography
Tim Speedle was a Trace and Impressions expert with the Miami-Dade Crime Lab from Jamaica, Queens. In the season 8 opener, it was revealed that he had been recommended to Horatio by Jesse Cardoza who transferred to the LAPD at the time and returned recently, Speedle was working at St. Petersburg PD at the time.

Death
Speed dies in the Season 3 opening episode, "Lost Son", after being mortally wounded during a gunfight in a jewelry store. He and Caine brace themselves for a fight, but Speedle's gun jams giving one of the thieves an opportunity to shoot him in the chest.  Caine calls for an ambulance, but Speedle succumbs to his injuries before help arrives, dying in Caine's arms. Speedle's death leaves the team, especially Caine and Delko, devastated. Internal Affairs is forced to investigate and Calleigh reports that the gun simply malfunctioned thereby closing the IAB investigation. A funeral is held and his parents and team are shown grieving over his loss.

Speedle's position on the team was later taken by Ryan Wolfe, a former Miami-Dade Police Department patrol officer.

Legacy
During a first-season episode, Speed and Delko, during a night of clubbing on the town, were caught in a devastating and deadly fire when the nightclub bouncer set the building alight in a twisted effort to be a hero. Speedle was instrumental in saving lives when he noticed an emergency-exit door ajar, and he guided many victims to safety. Despite the trauma of the blaze, he insisted on working the scene with the rest of his team (season one, episode 22, "Tinder Box").

A few months after his death, Sara Piper a.k.a. Cookie Devine, (season 3, episode 18, "Game Over") fears a sex tape she made with her boyfriend will be leaked. She goes to the lab and ask for Tim Speedle, who had previously helped her (season 2, episode 24, "Innocent") and Horatio overhears. He steps in and informs her that Speed had been killed in the line of duty but promises to look into her case.

Three years after Speedle's death, his memory is still tender in the hearts and minds of his colleagues. They have left his locker and effects intact, intriguing those who come after his demise (episode 6x04, "Bang, Bang, Your Debt").

References

CSI: Miami characters
Fictional forensic scientists
Fictional Miami-Dade Police Department detectives
Television characters introduced in 2002